Theta Upsilon was a national women's fraternity operating in the United States from February 1921 until May 1962, when the group was absorbed by the Delta Zeta sorority.

Local Club 
Theta Upsilon began as a local club at the University of California, Berkeley when six female students moved into a house on Walnut Street. The house became known as "The Walnut Shell".

In the academic year of –, twelve girls organized an official "house club" under the university. It was called Mekatina, which meant "Among the Hills". Mekatina had a ritual based on Native American themes. The pin was a rising sun.

National Fraternity 
On , the Mekatina students renamed themselves inaugural members of the Alpha chapter of Theta Upsilon. Ida Shaw Martin, of the Sorority Service Bureau, is credited with outlining the plans for Theta Upsilon and perfected its ritual.

Theta Upsilon would eventually install 38 chapters across the country. It benefited, too, from mergers with smaller groups. Early in its history, the fraternity merged with Lambda Omega sorority, which only the year prior had absorbed Alpha Sigma Delta sorority. The Norse values emphasized were hardihood, hospitality, economy, and friendship. Lambda Omega was an associate member of the National Panhellenic Conference. In , Lambda Omega was, in turn, absorbed by Theta Upsilon.

The chapter at Berkeley, therefore, was the product of three Alpha chapters of small national sororities, prior to itself merging into Delta Zeta's Mu chapter in 1962.

Merger with Delta Zeta
On May 6, 1962, Theta Upsilon fraternity was officially absorbed by Delta Zeta sorority. The ceremony was held at the Alpha Alpha chapter house at Northwestern University. Delta Zeta gained nine new collegiate chapters while several others were enhanced by mergers.

Chapters
Theta Upsilon had installed a total of 38 chapters by the time of the merger, counting its own and those it absorbed from Lambda Omega. Chapters active at the time of the  merger are those in bold, those which were inactive are noted in italics. 

In  there were four "overlaps" in chapters at California, Miami, Illinois, and Temple universities. These merged into existing Delta Zeta chapters on their respective campuses. 

Fairly early, a chapter at Ripon College reverted to its local name. Thirty years later it would become an Alpha Phi chapter. 

A chapter at Utah State University reverted to its local name, briefly, before becoming a Delta Delta Delta chapter.

Notes

Seven Degrees of Membership 
(Per Delta Zeta's history)

Rainbow Degree: pledge ceremony; new members received rainbow ribbons
Iris Degree: second pledge ceremony; pledge pin of sterling silver fleur-de-lis received
Covenant Degree: initiation degree, "full lifetime membership"; received official badge of "a pearled Θ superimposed upon Y"
Temple Degree: awarded to alumnae at national convention; distinguished those who "supported and cooperated with the national fraternity"
Laurel Degree: awarded to Temple degree members who showed "outstanding service"; given at National Convention
Mother/Patroness Degree: awarded to mothers of initiates, patronesses of college chapters, and housemothers.
Honorary Patron: awarded by college chapters to any man who made an outstanding contribution to the fraternity; approved by National Council

Symbols 
The flower was the iris.
The tree was the bay tree.
The patron was Apollo.
The official motto: Let there be light
The magazine was The Dial 
The colors were the Rainbow tints
Insignia were Rising Sun, Rainbow, Lion Rampant
The crest included a rampant lion on a rising sun, with a banner at the bottom with the Greek or Roman letters A, E, and I.

Creed 
"As a daughter of light, I believe in loyalty to God, the Light of all our being; in loyalty to our country, the land of opportunity and freedom, where all women have important roles to play; in loyalty to our fellowmen with whom I shall seek constantly understanding and true love.

"I believe in love, learning, and labor, bearing in mind that each is incomplete without the other- true love expressed through intelligence, service, learning acquired as a result of loving interest in others, and labor inspired by love and guided by intelligence.

"I believe in Theta Upsilon, its purposes, its ideals, and its aspirations. I pledge my heart, my head, and my hand to be a good citizen on the campus and in the community, to cooperate in all endeavors, to maintain high ideals in social life, to uphold a worthy standard in harmony with my sisters in Theta Upsilon, that together we may work to further the divine plan for all mankind." -- Beatrice Card Fuller.

See also
List of social fraternities and sororities
Delta Zeta
Lambda Omega

References 

 Baird's Manual of American College Fraternities (multiple volumes)

Fraternities and sororities in the United States
Delta Zeta
Defunct former members of the National Panhellenic Conference
1921 establishments in California
Student organizations established in 1921